Robert or Bob Appleby may refer to:

Robert Appleby (MP) (died 1407) for Lincoln
Robert Appleby (palaeontologist) (1922–2004), British palaeontologist
Robert Appleby (coach) (1922–2006), American football and baseball player and coach
Robert Kazinsky (born Robert John Appleby; 1983), English actor and model 
Robert Appleby (footballer), see List of Middlesbrough F.C. players
Bob Appleby (baseball) for Toledo Rockets baseball
Bob Appleby (actor) (died 2015) in The Horns of Nimon and Terror of the Vervoids

See also
Robert Appleby Bartram (disambiguation)
Charlie Appleby (speedway rider) (Robert Charles  Appleby, 1913–1946),  Canadian motorcycle speedway rider